Governor Shafer may refer to:

George F. Shafer (1888–1948), 16th Governor of North Dakota
Raymond P. Shafer (1917–2006), 39th Governor of Pennsylvania

See also
William Donald Schaefer (1921–2011), 58th Governor of Maryland
Ed Schafer (born 1946), 30th Governor of North Dakota
John Shaffer (politician) (1827–1870), Governor of Utah Territory in 1870
Víctor Manzanilla Schaffer (1924–2019), Governor of Yucatán from 1988 to 1991